The 7.5 cm Leichtgeschütz 40 was a recoilless gun used by the German Army during World War II.

Background
Development of recoilless weapons by Rheinmetall began in 1937 in an effort to provide airborne troops with heavy support weapons that could be dropped by parachute. Both Krupp and Rheinmetall competed for production contracts in a contest that was won by the latter. Initially produced under the designation of LG 1, this was soon changed to LG 40 to match the then current "year of origin" naming system.

Design issues
One characteristic common to all the German recoilless guns, was that they used ordinary shells, albeit with a different cartridge to cater to the unique issues involved in the recoilless principles.

This gun used HE shells from the 7.5 cm Gebirgsgeschütz (Mountain Gun) 36 and the anti-tank shell of the 7.5 cm Feldkanone 16, neuer Art (Field Cannon, New Model). This meant that its ammunition could not be optimized to benefit from the peculiar ballistic characteristics of recoilless weapons. On the other hand, it saved significant research time and effort and meant that existing production lines and stocks of shells could be used at a considerable saving.

Two problems became evident after the Leichtgeschütz (light gun) was fielded. The gas expelled through the venturi of the firing mechanism could cause fouling in the mechanism itself, but fixing this required a redesign of the entire breech and was deemed not worth disrupting the production line or rebuilding the existing guns. The second problem was more serious in that the mounting began to shake itself apart after about 300 rounds were fired. This was principally caused by the torque imparted to the mount when the shell engaged the rifling as well as by the erosion of the nozzles by the combustion gases. These could be countered by welding vanes inside the nozzles that were curved in a direction opposite to the rifling which would then counteract the torque exerted by the shell and minimizing the stress on the gun mount.

Operational use
The LG 40 first saw use during the Battle of Crete where it apparently equipped 2. Batterie/Fallschirmjäger-Artillerie-Abteilung (2nd Battery/Parachute Artillery Battalion). It saw widespread use by German parachute units, both Luftwaffe and Waffen-SS for the rest of the war. The 500th SS-Fallschirmjäger Battalion used four examples during its airdrop on Josip Broz Tito's headquarters at Drvar.

The German Gebirgsjäger (mountain infantry) also appreciated its light weight and used them during the battles in the Caucasus Mountains in the latter half of 1942.

References

Bibliography
Engelmann, Joachim and Scheibert, Horst. Deutsche Artillerie 1934-1945: Eine Dokumentation in Text, Skizzen und Bildern: Ausrüstung, Gliederung, Ausbildung, Führung, Einsatz. Limburg/Lahn, Germany: C. A. Starke, 1974
Hogg, Ian V. German Artillery of World War Two. 2nd corrected edition. Mechanicsville, PA: Stackpole Books, 1997

External links
 "Nazi 75mm Paracannon Has No Kick", April 1944 first report by US news media of 7.5 cm LG40
 Pagina 17 - Heavy Infantry Weapons scroll down to bottom of article for details and excellent photos of LG40
 Lone Sentry section on LG40 short technical article

World War II field artillery
World War II artillery of Germany
Recoilless rifles
Rheinmetall
75 mm artillery
Weapons and ammunition introduced in 1941